The 2021–22 season was the 76th season in the existence of U.C. Sampdoria and the club's 10th consecutive season in the top flight of Italian football. In addition to the domestic league, Sampdoria participated in this season's edition of the Coppa Italia.

Players

First-team squad

Out on loan

Transfers

Pre-season and friendlies

Competitions

Overall record

Serie A

League table

Results summary

Results by round

Matches
The league fixtures were announced on 14 July 2021.

Coppa Italia

Statistics

Appearances and goals

|-
! colspan=14 style=background:#dcdcdc; text-align:center| Goalkeepers

|-
! colspan=14 style=background:#dcdcdc; text-align:center| Defenders

|-
! colspan=14 style=background:#dcdcdc; text-align:center| Midfielders

|-
! colspan=14 style=background:#dcdcdc; text-align:center| Forwards

|-
! colspan=14 style=background:#dcdcdc; text-align:center| Players transferred out during the season

|-

References

U.C. Sampdoria seasons
Sampdoria